Brigadier-General Samuel Masham, 1st Baron Masham (1678/79 – 1758), was a British courtier in the court of Queen Anne, and the husband of her favourite, Abigail, Lady Masham.

Biography

Masham was born 1678/79, the eighth son of Sir Francis Masham, 3rd Baronet, and Mary Scott, in Otes in High Laver, the same house where John Locke had spent his final years. He was introduced to the Royal Household as page to Prince George of Denmark, the husband of the future Queen Anne. In 1701, he was promoted to the position of equerry. He was commissioned a captain in the 2nd Regiment of Foot Guards on 10 January 1704, and breveted a colonel of foot on 20 October.

He met his future wife, Abigail Hill, in about 1704, when she was appointed Lady of the Bedchamber to Anne, who was now Queen. This was the year that the Queen confided to the Earl of Godolphin that she did not believe that she and Sarah Churchill, Duchess of Marlborough – her closest friend up until now – could ever be true friends again. The Duchess, a Whig, was frequently absent from the Court, sometimes for long periods, and had become too overbearing for the Queen. Abigail, a Tory – helped by her flattery and subservience – quickly began to supplant the Duchess in the Queen's affections.

The Tory leader, Robert Harley, probably advised Masham of the advantages of marrying a royal favourite. However, Masham himself described it as a love match. The couple were married some time in 1707, in the presence of the Queen who contributed £2,000 to Abigail's dowry. The duchess, who was not consulted, learned about the marriage several months later and her subsequent argument with the Queen included accusations of lesbianism. This turned the Queen completely against her and paved the way for Abigail's rise.

Meanwhile, Masham was enjoying the rewards of Abigail's position. He was promoted to brigadier general in the army, and in 1710 became MP for Ilchester. In 1712, Robert Harley, now Earl of Oxford and Earl Mortimer, requested that the Queen create twelve new peers to pass negotiations for the Treaty of Utrecht which the Whigs were firmly against. Masham was one of those suggested to the Queen; but she only consented on the condition that Abigail continued to act as her dresser (a peeress was not expected to carry out the more menial duties of the bedchamber). He became Baron Masham of Otes, one of the twelve new creations known as "Harley's Dozen".

After Queen Anne's death in 1714, the new king, George I, reinstated the Whigs – and the Marlboroughs – to favour. Abigail retired into private life, but Samuel Masham became King's Remembrancer in 1716. He died in 1758, long outliving his wife.

In popular culture 
Samuel Masham is portrayed by actor Joe Alwyn in the 2018 film The Favourite.

References

Sources

1670s births
1758 deaths
Barons in the Peerage of Great Britain
British Army generals
Members of the Parliament of Great Britain for English constituencies
Coldstream Guards officers
Peers of Great Britain created by Queen Anne